Dato' Ir. Haji Nawawi bin Ahmad (3 May 1961 – 28 November 2022) was a Malaysian politician and engineer who served as the Member of Parliament (MP) for Langkawi from May 2013 to May 2018, Member of the Kedah State Executive Council (EXCO) in the Barisan Nasional (BN) state administration under former Menteris Besar Syed Razak Syed Zain Barakbah and Mahdzir Khalid from March 2004 to March 2008 as well as Member of the Kedah State Legislative Assembly (MLA) for Kuah from March 2004 to May 2013. A member of the United Malays National Organisation (UMNO), he was the Division Chief of UMNO of Langkawi.

In 2016, police are investigating Nawawi Ahmad’s claim that the ‘Malaysian Official 1', which the Department of Justice (DOJ) said received US$731 million from 1Malaysia Development Berhad (1MDB), is the Agong.

Controversy
In 2014, Nawawi apologised to the family of Karpal Singh, a leading opposition politician who had died in a car accident, for posting photos of Karpal's corpse on Facebook.

Death
Nawawi died in Frankfurt, Germany at about 3 am on 28 November 2022 on a working visit in his capacity as the Tenaga Nasional Berhad (TNB) board member. He was accompanied by his wife and buried in Frankfurt, Germany as well.

Election results

Honours
 :
 Knight Companion of the Order of Loyalty to the Royal House of Kedah (DSDK) – Dato’ (2006)

See also
Kuah (state constituency)
Langkawi (federal constituency)

References

1961 births
2022 deaths
People from Kedah
United Malays National Organisation politicians
Members of the Dewan Rakyat
Members of the Kedah State Legislative Assembly
Kedah state executive councillors
Malaysian people of Malay descent
Malaysian Muslims
Malaysian electrical engineers
21st-century Malaysian politicians